Salvador Infante Meyer (born 4 November 1951) is a Salvadoran chess player. He has won the Salvadoran Chess Championship 4 times (1982, 1985, 1994 and 1995). He was also part of the Salvadoran team which won the gold medal at the 1976 Against Chess Olympiad in Tripoli.

External links
 
 
 

1951 births
Living people
Salvadoran chess players
Chess FIDE Masters